Exoprosopa capucina is a species of 'bee fly' belonging to the family Bombyliidae subfamily Anthracinae.

This 'bee-fly' is present in most of Europe and in the Near East.

The average body length of the adults reaches . The head is quite large, with small antennae. The dark-brown wings are large too, with translucent areas on their margin and a completely dark cell (R1) on the front border,  without hyaline spot. The thorax and the abdomen are greyish brown.

References
 Mark van Veen, Zeist -   Exoprosopa Keys

External links
 Biolib
 Fauna Europaea 

Bombyliidae
Insects described in 1781
Diptera of Europe